The 1997 Connecticut Huskies football team represented the University of Connecticut in the 1997 NCAA Division I-AA football season. The Huskies were led by fourth-year head coach Skip Holtz, and completed the season with a record of 7–4.

Schedule

References

Connecticut
UConn Huskies football seasons
Connecticut Huskies football